A near-death experience or NDE is the perception reported by a person who nearly died or who was clinically dead and revived.

NDE or Ndé may also refer to:
 Ndé, a department in Cameroon
 Narrative Design Explorer,  a e-publication dedicated to interactive narrative design
 Netter Digital Entertainment, a company created by Douglas Netter 
 Neustadt-Dürkheimer Eisenbahn-Gesellschaft, an early German railway company 
 Nevada Desert Experience, a movement and an organization dedicated to deep ecology, appreciating the desert, and stopping the spread of nuclearism
 Nondestructive Examination or non-destructive testing, testing that does not destroy the test object
 Mandera Airport's IATA code